John G. King is an American politician who served in the Massachusetts House of Representatives from 1971 to 1979 and the Massachusetts Senate from 1979 to 1983.

Raised and educated in Danvers, Massachusetts, where he resides to this day, King has had a successful legal practice now based in Salem, Massachusetts.

References

1942 births
Boston University alumni
Democratic Party Massachusetts state senators
Democratic Party members of the Massachusetts House of Representatives
People from Danvers, Massachusetts
Suffolk University Law School alumni
Living people